Mathew Harris Ellsworth (September 17, 1899 – February 7, 1986) was an American newspaperman and politician who served six terms as a Republican U.S. congressman from Oregon from 1943 to 1957. He subsequently served as chairman of the United States Civil Service Commission. Prior to serving in the United States House of Representatives, Ellsworth had served for two years in the Oregon Senate.

Early life
Born in Hoquiam, Washington, Ellsworth moved together with his parents to Eugene, Oregon, and later to nearby Wendling, where he attended public schools. In 1922, he graduated with a journalism degree from the University of Oregon. He worked in the newspaper and lumber industries in the 1920s, and was an associate professor of journalism at the University of Oregon in 1928 and 1929. While serving as manager of the Oregon State Editorial Association (now the Oregon Newspaper Publishers Association), in 1929, he purchased an interest in The Roseburg News-Review, eventually becoming its editor and publisher. Ellsworth helped to bring a Veteran's Administration hospital to Roseburg, which provided construction jobs to the area hard-hit by the Great Depression. In 1936, he was instrumental in bringing KRNR radio on the air, one of Oregon's first radio stations based outside of Portland.

Political career
In 1941, Ellsworth was appointed to the Oregon State Senate. In 1942, Ellsworth was elected to the United States House of Representatives, representing Oregon's 4th congressional district, which had just been established after the 1940 census. He served seven terms, and sat on the House Appropriations Committee and House Rules Committee. In the 1956 election, he was narrowly defeated by Democrat Charles O. Porter, whom Ellsworth had defeated two years earlier.

After losing the election, Ellsworth was appointed by President Eisenhower to a two-year term as chairman of the United States Civil Service Commission, serving from April 18, 1957 until resigning on February 28, 1959.

After Congress
Ellsworth left politics and resumed his newspaper business and became a real estate broker. He retired to Albuquerque, New Mexico in the 1970s, where he lived until his death on February 7, 1986. He was interred at Gate of Heaven Cemetery, Albuquerque.

See also 
Mary F. Hoyt

References

External links 
Papers of Harris Ellsworth, Dwight D. Eisenhower Presidential Library
Biography from Roseburg News-Review, 10/20/02

1899 births
1986 deaths
University of Oregon alumni
People from Hoquiam, Washington
Republican Party Oregon state senators
Republican Party members of the United States House of Representatives from Oregon
20th-century American politicians